The Oswego–Oneida Streets Historic District is a national historic district located at Baldwinsville, Onondaga County, New York.  The district encompasses 32 contributing buildings on s in a residential section of Baldwinsville.  The district developed between about 1830 and 1920 and includes notable examples of Greek Revival, Italianate, and Gothic Revival residential architecture.

It was listed on the National Register of Historic Places in 1982 and includes .

References

Houses on the National Register of Historic Places in New York (state)
Greek Revival architecture in New York (state)
Italianate architecture in New York (state)
Historic districts in Onondaga County, New York
Historic districts on the National Register of Historic Places in New York (state)
National Register of Historic Places in Onondaga County, New York